Mary Aggie was an African-American slave known for taking part in a trial that resulted in a change in Virginia's statute law that allowed slaves to claim benefit of clergy.

In the late 1720s Aggie tried to sue for her freedom. The attempt was unsuccessful, but managed to catch the attention of Lieutenant Governor William Gooch, who presided over the trial and believed that Aggie had made a good case of establishing her belief in Christianity. This proved to be beneficial when, in September 1730, she was indicted for stealing goods valued at forty shillings from her owner, Annie or Anne Sullivan. The value of the goods was enough to make it a felony, which was punishable by death during this time period, and Aggie was brought to trial in York County, Virginia.

Upon hearing of her predicament Gooch sent an attorney to monitor the trial. Aggie again tried to plead for benefit of clergy, but was denied and Gooch appealed the decision. The appeal was divided and the case was referred to England for a final ruling. On May 6, 1731, Aggie was pardoned on the condition that she leave Virginia and on July 1, 1732, the Virginia General Assembly ruled that "any Negro, mulatto or Indian whatsoever" could claim benefit of clergy. While this was a victory for Gooch, the new law was also restrictive since it limited the amount of instances where slaves, blacks, or Indians could use this plea. The law also had other detrimental effects, as these people would now be unable to give testimony in court for any reason other than a slave being brought up for a capital offense and would also enable courts to use other forms of corporal punishment other than death.

Notes
Scholars differ on the spelling of Sullivan's first name.

References

18th-century American slaves
 18th-century African-American women
African-American history of Virginia
People from Virginia